A price tag is a label declaring the price of an item for sale. It may be a sticker or attached by twist tie or other means.

Some jurisdictions require items (possibly exceptions for bulk good and produce) to be individually marked with the price, or have shelf tags or barcode scanners available so customers can determine prices without consulting store staff.  In some cases, unit price is also required.

Some jurisdictions also outlaw price discrimination except for different quantities (e.g. quantity discounts are allowed) or different types of customers (e.g. individuals vs. organizations that might be expected to buy in bulk or have better creditworthiness).  For example, the 1936 Robinson–Patman Act outlaws this practice in the United States.

Many price tags also bear the name of the store.

History

Before the late 19th century, in most cases, retail goods did not have a fixed price, and each customer would be expected to haggle with the store clerk. The Quakers, who found it immoral for different customers to pay different prices (now known as price discrimination) were an exception.  

 

Macy's in New York (Rowland Hussey Macy was a Quaker) also began affixing physical tags to items in the 1870s, eliminating haggling.  This allowed shorter training time for new clerks (who would no longer need to know the art of haggling nor the range of accepted prices for every item) and allowed clerks to serve more customers.

Even large stores kept goods behind a counter, requiring clerks to fetch items for customers.  The Piggly Wiggly chain of grocery stores was the first to become self-service in 1916, further cementing the need for price tags.  Price tags soon became commonplace in Western retail stores, and haggling rare outside of proprietors and individuals selling used items.

References

See also
 Dynamic pricing, a modern counter-trend to constant pricing

Retail pricing
Retailing equipment and supplies
Retail store elements
Business models